Cedar Creek is a small rural locality  west of Cessnock in the Hunter Region of New South Wales, Australia. In 2016 the population was 33 people  and the median age was 44.

Some holiday accommodation is situated in the area for visitors to nearby vineyards.

The Cedar Creek, a perennial stream of the Hunter River catchment runs through the locality.

References

Suburbs of City of Cessnock
Towns in the Hunter Region